Vinu is both a surname and a given name. Notable people with the name include:

V. M. Vinu (born 1958), Indian film director
Vinu Chakravarthy (born 1945), Indian actor, script writer, and director
Vinu Mohan (born 1986), Indian actor

Indian surnames
Indian given names